The 2016–17 Oral Roberts Golden Eagles men's basketball team represented Oral Roberts University during the 2016–17 NCAA Division I men's basketball season. The Golden Eagles were led by 18th year head coach Scott Sutton and played their home games at the Mabee Center in Tulsa, Oklahoma as members of The Summit League. They finished the season 8–22, 4–12 in Summit League play to finish in last place. As a result, they failed to qualify for The Summit League tournament.

On April 10, 2017, the school fired all-time winningest coach Scott Sutton after 18 years. He finished with an overall record of 328–247. On April 28, the school hired Baylor assistant Paul Mills as the new head coach.

Previous season
The Golden Eagles finished the 2015–16 season 14–17, 6–10 in Summit League play to finish in seventh place. They lost in the quarterfinals of The Summit League tournament to South Dakota State.

Roster

Schedule

|-
!colspan=9 style=| Exhibition

|-
!colspan=9 style=| Regular season

|-
!colspan=9 style=| Summit League regular season

References

Oral Roberts Golden Eagles men's basketball seasons
Oral Roberts
2016 in sports in Oklahoma
2017 in sports in Oklahoma